Aurora is a city in Wise County, Texas, United States. The population was 1,390 in 2020.

Geography

Aurora is located at  (33.055942, –97.509615).

Demographics

As of the 2020 United States census, there were 1,390 people, 420 households, and 356 families residing in the city.

Education
The Town of Aurora is served by the Northwest Independent School District.

 Seven Hills Elementary (K–5)
 Chisholm Trail Middle School (6–8)
 Northwest High School (9–12)

UFO incident

Aurora is best known for a purported UFO crash in April 1897, and the ongoing legend that the UFO's pilot is supposedly buried in the local cemetery.  Although the town has embraced the legend to a point (the city's website mentions the legend, and even features an alien on the initial page), the cemetery association has refused all requests to exhume the alien's purported gravesite.

References

Sources
 Robert Wooster:

Further reading

 Reed, S. G. (1941) A History of the Texas Railroads, St. Clair, Houston; rpt. (1981) Arno, New York
 WPA Federal Writers' Project (1939) Port Arthur, Anson Jones Press, Houston
 DNAlien, A novel by Jim West (2007).

Cities in Texas
Cities in Wise County, Texas
Dallas–Fort Worth metroplex